

General 

While all of these people were pilots (and some still are), many are also noted for contributions in areas such as aircraft design and manufacturing, navigation or popularization.

A 

 Bert Acosta
 Saarah Hameed Ahmed
 John Alcock
 Buzz Aldrin
 Scott Anderson
 Gaby Angelini
 Kimberly Anyadike
 Neil Armstrong
 Ludovic Arrachart
 Jacqueline Auriol

B 

 Douglas Bader
 MaxBrandriet
 Richard Bach
 Italo Balbo
 Bernt Balchen
 Mike Bannister
 Pancho Barnes
 João Ribeiro de Barros
 Jean Batten
 André Beaumont
 Amelie Beese
 Elly Beinhorn
 Jose Berg
 Jean-Pierre Blanchard
 Lilian Bland
 Louis Blériot
 John Nicolaas Block
 William Boeing
 Arthur Whitten Brown
 Miles Browning
 The Hon Mrs Victor Bruce
 Milo Burcham
 Beverly Lynn Burns
 Richard Byrd

C 

 Artur de Sacadura Cabral
 Don Cameron
 George Cayley
 Hezârfen Ahmed Çelebi
 Lagâri Hasan Çelebi
 Clyde Cessna
 Francis Chichester
 Juan de la Cierva
 Henri Coandă
 Jerrie Cobb
 Sir Alan Cobham
 Jackie Cochran
 Lyle Paul Copeland Jr
 George Bertram Cockburn
 Bessie Coleman
 François Coli
 Carmela Combe
 Jean Louis Conneau
 Joseph Costa
 Max Conrad
 Dieudonné Costes
 Gago Coutinho
 Jessica Cox
 Henry Coxwell
 Albert Scott Crossfield
 Glenn Curtiss
 Sharifah Czarena

D 

 Steponas Darius
 Aida de Acosta
 B. H. DeLay
 Jurgis Dobkevičius
 Jimmy Doolittle
 Claudius Dornier
 Donald Douglas
 Douglas Douglas-Hamilton
 Neville Duke
 Hélène Dutrieu

E 

 Amelia Earhart
 Eugene Burton Ely

F 

 Craig Ferguson
 Henri Farman
 Charles Fern
 Anthony Fokker
 Steve Fossett
 Ramón Franco

G 

 Ernest K Gann
 Roland Garros
 Viola Gentry
 Dagoberto Godoy
 Sabiha Gökçen
 Mike Goulian
 Marlon Green
 Henri Guillaumet
 Bartolomeu de Gusmão
 Antanas Gustaitis

H 

 Melissa Haney
 Geoffrey de Havilland
 Mary, Lady Heath
 Ernst Heinkel
 Alex Henshaw
 Hilda Hewlett
 Bert Hinkler
 Bob Hoover
 Howard Hughes

I 

 Abbas Ibn Firnas

J 

 Tony Jannus
 Elrey Borge Jeppesen
 Jiro Horikoshi
 W. E. Johns
 Amy Johnson
Evelyn Bryan Johnson
 Tex Johnston
 Hubert Julian
 Hugo Junkers
 Joseph Joestar

K 

 Bettina Kadner
 Sir Charles Kingsford Smith
 Algene and Fred Key
 Vladimir Kokkinaki
 Opal Kunz

L 

 Clay Lacy
 Raymonde de Laroche
 Ruth Bancroft Law
 Bill Lear
 Alfred LeBlanc
 Léon Lemartin
 Tony LeVier
 Otto Lilienthal
 Charles Lindbergh
 Per Lindstrand
 Alexander Lippisch
 John H. Livingston
 Ormer Locklear

M 

 Eilmer of Malmesbury
 Paul Mantz
 Beryl Markham
 Angela Masson
 Wop May
 Esther Mbabazi
 Frederick McCall
 Marie McMillin
 Suzanne Melk
 Mike Melvill
 Jean Mermoz
 Russel Merrill
 Betty Miller
 Billy Mitchell
 R. J. Mitchell
 Geraldine "Jerrie" Mock
 Charlotte Möhring
 Jim Mollison
 Montgolfier brothers
 John J. Montgomery
 Ed Musick

N 

 Jorge Newbery
 Charles Nungesser

O 

 Phoebe Omlie

P 

 Clyde Pangborn
 John Lankester Parker
 Ivy May Pearce
 Richard Pearse
 Percy Pilcher
 Francesco de Pinedo
 Albert Plesman
 Paul Poberezny
 Tom Poberezny
 Wiley Post

Q 

 Jeffrey Quill
 Harriet Quimby

R 

 Bessica Medlar Raiche
 Robert Campbell Reeve
 Molly Reilly
 Hanna Reitsch
 Sally Ride
 Margaret Ringenberg
 Keith Rosenkranz
 Yves Rousseau
 Edvard Rusjan
 Mathias Rust
 Dick Rutan

S 

 Antoine de Saint-Exupéry
 Alberto Santos-Dumont
 Blanche Stuart Scott
 Sheila Scott
 Igor Sikorsky
 Elinor Smith
 Sir Ross Smith
 Sir Thomas Sopwith
 Melitta Schenk Gräfin von Stauffenberg
 Katherine Stinson
 John Stringfellow
 Chesley Sullenberger

T 

 Kurt Tank
 Louise Thaden
 Bobbi Trout
 Sean D. Tucker

V 

 Polly Vacher
 Traian Vuia

W 

 Patty Wagstaff
 Emily Warner
 Erich Warsitz
 Arthur Whitten-Brown
 Frank Whittle
 Roger Q. Williams
 Orville and Wilbur Wright

Y 

 W.A. Yackey
 Lewis Yancey
 Chuck Yeager
 Jeana Yeager
 John Young

Z 

 Bernard Ziegler

Military pilots

A 

 Muhammad Mahmood Alam
 John Astle

B 

 Richard Bach
 Douglas Bader
 Francesco Baracca
 Kristin Bass
 Arturo Merino Benítez
 Brian Binnie
 Mark Binskin
 Billy Bishop
 Richard Bong
 Robert Benedict Bourdillon
 John Boyd
 Pappy Boyington
 Eric Brown
 James E. Brown III
 Roy Brown
 Willa Brown
 Eugene Bullard

C 

 Pierre Clostermann
 Stephen Coonts
 Chip Cravaack

D 

 Benjamin O. Davis, Jr.
 Jimmy Doolittle

F 

 Joe Foss

G 

 Yuri Gagarin
 Roland Garros
 Roy Geiger
 Jim Gibbons
 Guy Gibson
 Richard E. Gray

H 

 Erich Hartmann
 Laurie Hawn
 Cedric Howell
 James W. Huston

J 

 James Jabara

K 
 Shawna Rochelle Kimbrell

L 

 Clay Lacy
 Fred Ladd
 Tom Landry
 Hazel Ying Lee
 Lydia Litvyak
 Lee Lue
 Frank Luke

M 

 Mike Mangold
 Edward "Mick" Mannock
 Charles McGee
Karina Miranda
 Billy Mitchell

N 

 Jorge Newbery

O

 Edward O'Hare
Lola Odujinrin
 Robin Olds
 Shane Osborn

P 
 Keith Park

R 

 Hanna Reitsch
 Manfred von Richthofen
 Eddie Rickenbacker
 Harry Robinson
 Hans-Ulrich Rudel

S 

 Nirmal Jit Singh Sekhon
 Brian Shul
 Denny Smith
 James Stewart
 Vang Sue

T 

 Stephen W. Thompson
 Hugh Thompson, Jr.
 Paul Tibbets
 Siyka Tsoncheva

V 

 Valentina Tereshkova
 Werner Voss

W 

 Douglas (Duke) Warren
 James White

Y 

 W.A. Yackey
 Chuck Yeager

Z 

 Fred Zinn

Other famous figures with an aviation history 

The following is a list of notable people from various professions who are also pilots:

A 

 Prince Andrew, Duke of York
 Carl Anthony, American actor
 James Arness, American actor
 David Ascalon, contemporary sculptor and stained glass artist; co-founder of Ascalon Studios

B 

 Dierks Bentley, American country musician  
 Prince Bernhard of Lippe-Biesterfeld
 Ryan Bittle, American actor
 Michael Bloomberg, Mayor of New York City from 2002 to 2013
 André Borschberg, Swiss businessman
 Richard Branson, Chairman, Virgin Group
 Aaron Buerge, The Bachelor star
 Jimmy Buffett, American singer, songwriter, author, businessman
 Gisele Bündchen, Brazilian model
 George H. W. Bush, 41st President of the United States
 George W. Bush, eldest son of George H. W. Bush and 43rd President of the United States
 Rod Buskas, Canadian ice hockey player

C 

 Josh Cahill, Aviation YouTuber
Maie Casey, Australian pioneer aviator, poet, librettist, biographer, memoirist and artist; wife of Richard Casey; Governor-General of Australia, 1969–74
 Kirby Chambliss, American aerobatics world champion
 Roy Clark, American musician
 Dave Coulier, American actor and comedian 
 Tom Cruise, American actor

D 

 Roald Dahl, British novelist, short story writer and screenwriter
 Terry Deitz,  American television personality
 Glen Dell, South African commercial airline trainer and aerobatics pilot
 John Denver, American country music/folk singer-songwriter and folk rock musician
 Mukul Dev, Indian actor
 Bruce Dickinson, English singer, TV presenter, airline pilot
 Michael Dorn, American actor
 Billie Dove, American actress
 Jerry Doyle,  American talk radio host, right-libertarian political commentator and television actor
 Jeff Dunham, American ventriloquist and stand-up comedian.

E 

 Clint Eastwood, American actor, director
 Noel Edmonds, English television presenter and executive
 Carl Edwards, American NASCAR driver
 Hunter Ellis, American television personality

F 

 Craig Ferguson, Scottish-American television host
 Harrison Ford, American actor
 Malcolm Forbes, hot air balloon pilot
 Morgan Freeman, American actor

G 

 Lea Gabrielle, American fighter pilot turned journalist, Correspondent for Fox News Channel
 Rajiv Gandhi, prime minister of India 1984–1989, son of India's first female prime minister Indira Gandhi
 David Gilmour, English musician, best known as the guitarist, lead singer and one of the songwriters in the rock band Pink Floyd
 John Glenn, American astronaut and former Ohio senator
 Hermann Göring, German politician, military leader and a leading member of the Nazi party
 Mark-Paul Gosselaar, American actor
 Kirby Grant, Sky King
 Ken Griffey Jr., Major League Baseball 13-time All-Star

H 

 Howard Hawks, American film director, producer and screenwriter of the classic Hollywood era
 Alfred C. Haynes, American Speaker at social events
 Rudolf Hess, prominent figure in Nazi Germany
 Dexter Holland, singer and rhythm guitarist for the Californian punk pop band The Offspring
 Wil Horneff, American actor
 Harry Houdini, Hungarian-American magician and escapologist, stunt performer, actor and film producer
 Gary Hubler, Champion of the Reno Air Races
 Bruce Hyer, Canadian politician

J 

 Angelina Jolie, American actress
 Bart Johnson, American actor
 Steve Jones, Red Bull Air Race World Series competitor

K 

 Greg Kelly, American journalist; youngest son of NYPD commissioner Raymond Kelly; anchor of WNYW (Fox 5 New York)
 John F. Kennedy, Jr., son of assassinated U. S. president John F. Kennedy
 John Kerry, U.S. Secretary of State
 BB King, musician
 Kris Kristofferson, American writer, singer-songwriter, actor and musician
 Larry Kusche, American author

L 

 Veronica Lake, American actress
 Lorenzo Lamas, American actor
 Cory Lidle, former American baseball player
 Per Lindstrand
 Tom Logan, American director, writer, producer, acting instructor, and former actor
 Shane Lundgren, American aviator and commercial aviation businessman and entrepreneur

M 

 William P. MacCracken, Jr., First Assistant Secretary of Commerce for Aeronautics
 Joe Manchin, United States Senator and Governor of West Virginia
 Dean Paul Martin, American singer and actor
 Soong Mei-ling, former first lady of China
 John McCain, senior U.S. Senator from Arizona, 2008 U.S. presidential candidate
 Richie McCaw, retired New Zealand rugby great, now working as a helicopter pilot in his homeland 
 Jay McGraw, American writer
 Phil McGraw, American television personality; host of Dr. Phil
 Tim McGraw, American actor and musician 
 Michael of Romania, the last King of Romania, and one of the last living leaders of World War II
 John Michels, American football player
 Arseny Mironov, Russian aerospace engineer and aviator, scientist in aircraft aerodynamics and flight testing
 Paul Moyer, American journalist; veteran television news broadcaster in Southern California
 Thurman Munson, former American baseball player

N 

 Gary Numan, English singer, musician, composer, air display pilot, flying examiner

O 

 Vivek Oberoi, Indian actor
 Miles O'Brien, American journalist; former CNN correspondent
 Susan Oliver, Emmy-nominated American actress, television director and aviator

P 

 Arnold Palmer, late American champion golfer 
 Fess Elisha Parker, American actor
 Jake Pavelka, reality TV personality
 Rick Perry, Texas Governor
 Brad Pitt, American actor
 Dave Price, American journalist, Anchor of WNYW (Fox 5 New York), anchor of Good Day New York
 Michael D. Protack, American businessman and candidate for Governor of Delaware

Q 

 Dennis Quaid, American actor

R 

 Lars Rådeström,  Swedish fighter aircraft test pilot
 Kangana Ranaut, Indian actress
 Katherine Rawls, multiple United States national champion in swimming and diving in the 1930s
 Christopher Reeve, American actor, director, producer and writer
 Earl W. Renfroe, history maker in the field of orthodontics and in breaking down the barriers of racism
 Rob Riggle, American actor and comedian
 James A. Rice, American attorney, judge, and politician
 Cliff Robertson, former American actor
 Ed Robertson, Canadian musician
 Stephen Rogers, Canadian politician
 Charles Rolls, British aviation pioneer
 Kurt Russell, American actor

S 

 Chuck Scarborough, American journalist; veteran television news anchor for WNBC (Channel 4 New York)
 Carlo Schmid, youngest solo pilot to fly around the world
 Jon Scott, American journalist, anchor for Fox News channel
 Ryan Shore, Grammy and Emmy Award-nominated composer for film, television, games, theater and records
 Nevil Shute, popular British novelist; successful aeronautical engineer
 Dean Smith, American pioneer pilot
 James Stewart, popular American actor

T 

 J. R. D. Tata, Indian industrialist
 Ratan Naval Tata, Indian industrialist
 Norman Tebbit, British Conservative politician
 John Travolta, American actor
 Ariel Tweto, one of two daughters of the Alaska airline family

U 

 Dieter F. Uchtdorf, Second Counselor in the First Presidency of The Church of Jesus Christ of Latter-day Saints

V 

 Gore Vidal, American novelist, screenwriter, playwright, essayist, short story writer, actor and politician
 Mike Vogel, American actor
 Pavel Vlasov, Russian test pilot, Hero of the Russian Federation
 Igor Volk, Soviet test pilot, cosmonaut, Hero of the Soviet Union

W 

 Bonny Warner, American luger
 Frank Welker, American actor, best known for the thousands of voices he performs in television and films including Freddie in Scooby-Doo and Megatron in the Transformers franchise.
 Prince William, Duke of Cambridge
 Willem-Alexander of the Netherlands, King of the Netherlands and part-time KLM pilot
 Ted Williams, left fielder in Major League Baseball

See also 
 List of Russian aviators
 List of women aviators

External links 
 Database of notable aviators with photos

References